The 334th Bombardment Group is an inactive United States Air Force unit. From 1942 to 1944, it served as a Replacement Training Unit at Greenville Army Air Base, South Carolina. It was disbanded on 1 May 1944 in a reorganization of Army Air Forces training units.  The group was reconstituted in 1985 as the 334th Air Refueling Wing.  It was converted to provisional status in 2005 as the 334th Air Expeditionary Group and has been activated for exercises.

History
The 334th Bombardment Group was activated on 16 July 1942 at Greenville Army Air Base, South Carolina.  Its original components were the 470th, 471st, 472nd and 473d Bombardment Squadrons, and the group was equipped with North American B-25 Mitchells.  It became part of Third Air Force, which was responsible for the majority of medium bomber training for the Army Air Forces (AAF). 

The 354th acted as a Replacement Training Unit (RTU) for the B-25.  The RTU was an oversized unit which trained individual pilots and aircrews, after which they would be assigned to operational units.  However, the AAF found that standard military units, whose manning was based on relatively inflexible tables of organization were not well adapted to the training mission.  Accordingly, it adopted a more functional system in which each base was organized into a separate numbered unit, manned according to the base's specific needs.  As this reorganization was implemented in the Spring of 1944, the 334th Group, its components and supporting units at Greenville, were disbanded on 1 May and replaced by the 330th AAF Base Unit (Medium, Bombardment).  

The emblems of the group's four squadrons were variations of "Bomby the Bear", and were featured in a National Geographic article about military insignia.  

The group was reconstituted in July 1985 as the 334th Air Refueling Wing, but remained in inactive status.   It was converted to provisional status as the 334th Air Expeditionary Group and assigned to Air Combat Command (ACC) to activate or inactivate as needed.  ACC activated the group in 2007 for Exercise Ardent Sentry  It was again active to control exercise units in July 2010

Lineage
 Constituted as the 334th Bombardment Group (Medium) on 9 July 1942
 Activated on 16 July 1942
 Disbanded on 1 May 1944
 Reconstituted on 31 July 1985 and redesignated 334th Air Refueling Wing
 Converted to provisional status and redesignated 334th Air Expeditionary Group on 21 October 2005
 Activated on 9 May 2007
 Inactivated on 23 May 2007
 Activated 5 July 2010
 Inactivated c. July 2010

Assignments
 Third Air Force, 16 July 1942 – 1 May 1944
 Air Combat Command, to activate or inactivate as needed after 21 October 2005
 1st Aerospace Expeditionary Task Force, 9 May–23 May 2007
 1st Air And Space Expeditionary Task Force, 5 July 2010–c. July 2010

Components
 334th Expeditionary Medical Operations Squadron: 9 May–23 May 2007
 470th Bombardment Squadron: 16 July 1942 – 1 May 1944
 471st Bombardment Squadron: 16 July 1942 – 1 May 1944
 472d Bombardment Squadron: 16 July 1942 – 1 May 1944
 473d Bombardment Squadron: 16 July 1942 – 1 May 1944

Stations
 Greenville Army Air Base, South Carolina, 16 July 1942 – 1 May 1944
 Camp Atterbury, Indiana, 9 May–23 May 2007
 Camp A. P. Hill, Virginia, 5 July 2010–c. July 2010

Aircraft
 North American B-25 Mitchell, 1942–1944

References

Notes

Bibliography

 
 
 
 

Bombardment groups of the United States Army Air Forces
Military units and formations established in 1942
Military units and formations disestablished in 1944